The Coppice, Kelvedon Hatch is a  biological Site of Special Scientific Interest in Kelvedon Hatch in Essex.

The site is an ancient semi-natural wood in the valley of a small tributary of the River Roding. It is base-rich alder on the valley floor, and oak and hornbeam in other areas. The geology is complex, with areas of Claygate Beds and Bagshot Beds. The shrub layer is sparse, but the stream provides an additional habitat.

There is no public access, but a footpath runs along the western boundary.

References 

Sites of Special Scientific Interest in Essex